This is a list of rivers of Iraq.

Persian Gulf
Shatt al-Arab
Euphrates
Shatt al-Hayy or Gharraf Canal, distributary of the Tigris
Wadi al-Khirr
Wadi al-Ubayyid
Wadi al-Ghadaf
Wadi Tharthar
Wadi Hauran
Tigris
Diyala River
Khasa River
'Adhaim
Little Zab
Great Zab
Khazir River
Khabur River

Syrian Desert
Wadi al-Mirah
Wadi Hamir
Wadi Ar'ar
Wadi al Batin

See also 
 List of dams and reservoirs in Iraq
 Water supply and sanitation in Iraq

References
Rand McNally, The New International Atlas, 1993.

Iraq
Rivers
Water in Iraq